Tersana Sporting Club is an Egyptian sports club based in Meet Okba, Giza, Egypt. It is best known for its professional football team, which plays in the Egyptian Second Division, the second-highest league in the Egyptian football league system.

Tersana's most important accomplishments include winning the Egypt Cup title six times and the Egyptian league title once. On the continental side, Tersana also participated in the CAF Cup Winners' Cup once in 1987 and was eliminated in the second round by Tunisian Espérance. The first leg,  played in Cairo, ended with a draw, while the second leg, played in Tunisia ended in a 0–2 loss.

History

The Tersana SC was established in 1921, when Egypt was a British protectorate, by English Major E.W. Slaughter. He became the first president of the club which was based first in Bulaq, then to Agouza, and to its current headquarters in Mit Okba in 1958.

The main reason for its establishment was to serve the staff of the Maritime Administration (currently the Ministry of Irrigation), so it was called Tersana. Blue uniforms were chosen to represent the sea.

There are different explanations for the nickname 'Hammers', typically signifying the hardness of the team.  The most famous legend involves the team recruiting a number of former fedayeen.  The nickname was popularized by sports critics Abdul Majid Noman and Najib Almstkawi after the intervention of defender Fouad Gouda, causing injury on foot Saleh Selim.

Record

Top scorers in Egyptian Premier League

By season

Total goals for Tersana

Egyptian caps

Formal records

Egyptian Premier League
 Tersana holds the record for highest goals in a single season with 71 in 1963–64.
 Hassan El-Shazly has the highest goals by a player with 34 in 1974–75.

 Hassan El-Shazly has the most hat-tricks with ten.
 Hassan El-Shazly is top league scorer with 173 goals.
 Hassan El-Shazly won top scorer in record four seasons

Africa Cup of Nations
 Hassan El-Shazly has the most hat-tricks with two, in Nigeria 1963 and Ivory Coast 1970.
 Hassan El-Shazly is most valuable player in 1963.
 Hassan El-Shazly is top scorer in 1963 with six goals
 Hassan El-Shazly is top Egyptian scorer and fourth top scorer with 12 goals
1964 Summer Olympics
 Moustafa Reyadh is second top scorer with 8 goals
 Moustafa Reyadh is the only Egyptian player to score 6 goals in one match

Rivalry

The Mit Okba Derby is a football match between Tersana SC and Zamalek SC.  The two Egyptian clubs have been rivals since their creations, and have both contested in the Egyptian Premier League, the country's top-flight football league.

Tersana SC won the league title in the 1962–63 season, while Zamalek won the title 12 times. The largest winning margin in this derby was 7–3 for Zamalek, in the 1962–63 season.

Statistics

Honours
 Egyptian Premier League
 Winners (1): 1962–63
 Runners up (5): 1948–49, 1949–50, 1959–60, 1963–64, 1974–75
 Egypt Cup
 Winners (6): 1923, 1929, 1954, 1965, 1967, 1986
 Runners up (3): 1950, 1956, 1966
Sultan Hussein Cup
 Winners (2): 1928, 1930
 Runners up (2): 1926, 1931
 Cairo League
 Winners (1): 1932–33
 Runners up (4): 1930–31, 1933–34, 1947–48, 1949–50

Performance in the Egyptian Premier League

Performance in CAF competitions
FR = First round
SR = Second round

Notes

Performance in Arab competitions

 Arab Club Championship: 1 appearance
 1987 – Fourth place

Board of directors

Current squad

Current technical staff

Notable players

  Abdel Halim El-Hamalawi
  Abdel Kader Mohamed
  Abdel Khair Saleh
  Abdel Nabi Mahmoud
  Ahmed Nagui
  Ali Maher
  Ali Mohamed Riad
  Badawi Abdel Fattah
  Fathi Baioumy
  Gamal Abdel Halim
  Hamdeto Ahmed
  Hamdi Abdel Fattah
  Hamza Abdel Mawla
  Hassan Ali
  Hassan Allouba
  Hassan El-Shazly
  Hossam Hassan
  João Rafael Kapango
  Mahmoud El-Shaghbi
  Mahmoud Hassan
  Mahmoud Fouad
  Mohamed Abdel Wahed
  Mohamed Aboul Ezz
  Mohamed Aboutraika
  Mohamed Ramadan
  Mouhanad Boushi
  Mohei Sharshar
  Moustafa Reyadh
  Raafat Mekki
  Shaker Abdel Fattah

References

External links
 Tersana History 

Egyptian Second Division
Football clubs in Cairo
Football clubs in Egypt
Sport in Giza
1921 establishments in Egypt
Association football clubs established in 1921